Ronald Dean Blaylock (born May 27, 1939) is a former American football coach. He served the head football coach at Yankton College in Yankton, South Dakota from 1962 to 1965 and Kansas State Teachers College—now known as Emporia State University—in Emporia, Kansas from 1967 to 1968, compiling a career college football coaching record of 19–25–2.

Blaylock played college football as quarterback at Kansas State University, lettering in 1959 and 1960. He began his coaching career at Emporia State as backfield coach under Keith Caywood while earning his master's degree.

Blaylock was married to Virginia Kay Blaylock, who died in 2006.

Head coaching record

References

1939 births
Living people
American football quarterbacks
Emporia State Hornets football coaches
Kansas State Wildcats football players
Yankton Greyhounds football coaches
Emporia State University alumni
People from Emporia, Kansas
Coaches of American football from Kansas
Players of American football from Kansas